Karolina Bosiek (born 20 February 2000) is a Polish speed skater. She competed in the women's 3000 metres at the 2018 Winter Olympics. In 2019, she won silver medals in the 1500 meters event and the general classification, as well as bronze medals in the 1000 meters and the 3000 meters events at the World Junior Speed Skating Championships held in Baselga di Pine, Italy.

References

External links

2000 births
Living people
Polish female speed skaters
Olympic speed skaters of Poland
Speed skaters at the 2018 Winter Olympics
Speed skaters at the 2022 Winter Olympics
People from Tomaszów Mazowiecki
Sportspeople from Łódź Voivodeship
Speed skaters at the 2016 Winter Youth Olympics
21st-century Polish women